Nima Tamang (born 30 March 1993) is an Indian footballer who plays as a striker for United Sikkim F.C. in the I-League.

Career

United Sikkim
Tamang made his debut for United Sikkim F.C. on 24 January 2013 during an I-League match against Mohun Bagan A.C. at the Salt Lake Stadium in Kolkata, West Bengal in which he was in Starting 11; United Sikkim drew the match 0–0.

Career statistics

Club
Statistics accurate as of 12 May 2013

References

Indian footballers
1993 births
Living people
Footballers from Sikkim
Indian Gorkhas
I-League players
United Sikkim F.C. players
Association football forwards